The Block House is a historic building located off Naamans Road in Claymont, Delaware. The Block House is believed to be the only structure remaining of original settlement on Naamans Creek.

History

The Block House is believed to have been constructed in 1654 under instruction of Johan Risingh, who was the last Governor of the Colony of New Sweden. Chief Peminacka of the Minqua tribe had deeded the large tract of land along Naaman's Creek to John Risingh on behalf of the Swedish colony. The structure was originally designed for defense. During  September 1655, the Block House was taken by the Dutch West India Company under Peter Stuyvesant at the same time Dutch forces captured Fort Christina. In 1671, the Block House was attacked by Native Americans. It was captured by the British Army in 1777 during the American Revolutionary War.

Several yards south of the Block House is the Robinson House. The Block House consists of one room with a lower and upper level. Inside is a relatively large fireplace and the former living quarters for the Robinson House cook. The correct date of construction has recently been disputed. Some say the Block House was not built until later, possibly around the time the Robinson House was built in 1723.

See also
List of the oldest buildings in Delaware

References

Other sources
Johnson, Amandus Johan Classon Rising: The Last Governor of New Sweden (Philadelphia: The Swedish Colonial Society, 1915)
 Ward, Christopher. Dutch and Swedes on the Delaware, 1609 - 1664 (University of Pennsylvania Press, 1930)

External links
Delaware Forts
Landmarks of the United States
New Castle County Markers
Claymont Historical Society

Pre-statehood history of Delaware
Houses in New Castle County, Delaware
New Sweden
Swedish migration to North America
Swedish-American culture in Delaware
1654 establishments in the Thirteen Colonies
Blockhouses